The Four-Coalition, also translated as the Coalition of Four or Quad-Coalition, abbreviated to 4K, was a liberal centre-right political alliance in the Czech Republic between 1998 and 2002.

The four member parties were:
 Christian and Democratic Union – Czechoslovak People's Party (KDU–ČSL), an established, large Christian democratic party
 Freedom Union (US), a new, large conservative liberal party that split from the Civic Democrats
 Democratic Union (DEU), an established, small liberal party
 Civic Democratic Alliance (ODA), an established, small liberal conservative party

The 4K was formed after the creation of the Opposition Agreement by the Czech Social Democratic Party and Civic Democratic Party in the aftermath of the 1998 election to the Chamber of Deputies.  The coalition aimed to provide 'real opposition' to the government.  The parties first participated together in the 1998 Senate election, achieving considerable success and winning 13 of the 27 seats up for election.

The coalition formalised and centralised, with the merger of the US and DEU to form Freedom Union – Democratic Union (US-DEU) reducing the number of parties to three.  However, the overbearing size of the KDU–ČSL – significantly larger than the others – lent instability to the coalition, as KDU–ČSL members used the coalition to further their intra-party factions.  The KDU–ČSL put pressure on the ODA to further consolidate, either reforming its long-standing debts or merging with the US-DEU.  The ODA refused, and withdrew from the Four-Coalition as a result.

In the 2002 election to the Chamber, the KDU–ČSL and US-DEU ran on a looser joint ticket called 'Coalition' (Koalice), and won 31 seats and 14% of the vote—down from the combined 39 seats and 19% of votes in the 1998 election.

Election results

Chamber of Deputies

Senate

* Places are by number of votes gained.

Regional Assemblies

Footnotes

References
 

Conservative parties in the Czech Republic
Liberal parties in the Czech Republic
Defunct political party alliances in the Czech Republic
Political parties established in 1998
Political parties disestablished in 2002
KDU-ČSL
Civic Democratic Alliance
Freedom Union – Democratic Union